William Gallagher is a British writer and journalist.  He has written Doctor Who audio plays for the Big Finish range, the stage play Manhattenhenge (2008–2009) and the Rhubarb Radio series Attachment (2009). His book on Alan Plater's The Beiderbecke Affair was published by the British Film Institute and Palgrave Macmillan on 28 September 2012.

On publication of the book, he released an Author Video about the writing of it and a series of Beiderbecke podcasts: video interviews and audio commentaries for selected episodes of the Beiderbecke saga.

From 2005 to 2010 he wrote and presented UK DVD Review, a podcast that peaked in the top 25 of all iTunes podcasts in all categories worldwide (BBC News reports).

He has written for publications including The Independent, the Los Angeles Times.  His journalism appears in Radio Times magazine and website, plus BBC News Online.

In March 2011 he announced on his 'Self Distract' blog that he was writing a four-part Doctor Who audio for Big Finish which is called Wirrn Isle. It was released in March 2012 and starred Colin Baker.

In February 2013 his third Big Finish story, Doctor Who: Spaceport Fear, was released. The two-hour radio comedy drama stars Colin Baker as the Doctor and Bonnie Langford as Mel with guest star Ronald Pickup. A fourth, Doctor Who: Scavenger is due in March 2014.

Between December 2014 and July 2015, Gallagher wrote Apple-centric app reviews and other features on MacNN.com. He is presently doing the same at AppleInsider.com. He also co-hosts the AppleInsider Podcast with Stephen Robles.

Writing Credits

Awards and nominations

References

External links 
 
 
 

Living people
British writers
Year of birth missing (living people)
Writers from Birmingham, West Midlands